Thomas Cave may refer to:

Sir Thomas Cave (died 1609) (1540–1609), MP for Leicester
Cave-Browne-Cave baronets called Thomas Cave, including:
Sir Thomas Cave, 3rd Baronet (1681–1719), British MP for Leicestershire 1711–1719
Sir Thomas Cave, 5th Baronet (1712–1778), his son, British MP for Leicestershire 1741–1747 and 1762–1774
Sir Thomas Cave, 7th Baronet (1766–1792), his grandson, British MP for Leicestershire 1790–1792
Thomas Cave (Liberal politician) (1825–1894), Member of Parliament for Barnstaple 1865–1880
Thomas Cave (merchant) (died 1603), English chapman and cloth merchant
Thomas H. Cave (1870–1958), Vermont political figure who served as State Treasurer
Tom Cave (born 1991), British rally driver

See also
Cave (disambiguation)